Once Upon an Era is the first demo album by the Northern Irish Celtic metal band Waylander. It was recorded at Hillcrest Studios Lurgan, County Armagh and released in 1994. It is notable for being the only Waylander recording to feature original bassist Jason Barriskill.

Track listing

Band line-up
Ciaran O'Hagan - vocals
Dermot O'Hagan - guitars 
Jason Barriskill - bass
Den Ferran - drums

Waylander (band) albums
1994 albums
Demo albums